Filip Král (born October 20, 1999) is a Czech professional ice hockey player. He is currently playing for the Toronto Marlies of the American Hockey League, as a prospect to the Toronto Maple Leafs of the National Hockey League (NHL). He was drafted 149th overall by the Maple Leafs in the 2018 NHL Entry Draft.

Playing career
Král began playing hockey in his hometown of Blansko at the age of three.  In the Czech Republic Král has played within in system of HC Kometa Brno, and played 27 games with the professional club across two seasons, recording two assists. In 2017, Král was drafted in the second round, 78th overall during the CHL Import Draft by Spokane. He started the 2017–18 season with Kometa Brno, but opted out of his contract four games into the season to play in the WHL. He was signed by Chiefs on October 6 and committed to play for the team during the 2017–18 season, marking the first time he would play outside of his native country. During his first season in North America, Král put up 35 points in 54 games, second on team scoring for defenceman (behind only Ty Smith, who was also selected during the 2018 NHL draft).

On 2 April 2020, Král was signed to a three-year, entry-level contract by the Toronto Maple Leafs. On 12 August 2020, Král was assigned by the Maple Leafs to Czech second tier club, HC Přerov, on loan until the commencement of the delayed 2020–21 North American season.

Career statistics

Regular season and playoffs

International

References

External links
 

1999 births
Living people
Czech ice hockey defencemen
HC Kometa Brno players
People from Blansko
HC ZUBR Přerov players
SK Horácká Slavia Třebíč players
Spokane Chiefs players
Toronto Maple Leafs draft picks
Toronto Maple Leafs players
Toronto Marlies players
Sportspeople from the South Moravian Region
Czech expatriate ice hockey players in Canada
Czech expatriate ice hockey players in the United States